Divis Tower is a 20-floor,  tall tower in Belfast, Northern Ireland. It is located in Divis Street, which is the lower section of the Falls Road. It is currently the fifteenth-tallest building in Belfast.

History
The tower was built in 1966 as part of the now-demolished Divis Flats complex, which comprised twelve eight-storey blocks of terraces and flats, named after the nearby Divis Mountain. The tower, a vertical complex of 96 flats housing approximately 110 residents, was designed by architect Frank Robertson for the Northern Ireland Housing Trust. The site on which the Tower stands was previously the location of the Sir Charles Lanyon-designed Falls Road Methodist Church, which opened in 1854 and closed in 1966. The site was sold to Belfast Corporation for approximately £11,000. A television documentary has been made about the tower.

The Troubles

British Army observation post
In response to Provisional IRA and INLA activity in the area, the British Army constructed an observation post on the roof in the 1970s and occupied the top two floors of the building. At the height of the Troubles, the Army was only able to access the post by helicopter.

Patrick Rooney and Emmanuel McClarnon shootings
Divis Tower was a flashpoint area during the height of the Troubles. Nine-year-old Patrick Rooney, the first child killed in the Troubles, was killed in the tower during the Northern Ireland riots of August 1969, when the Royal Ulster Constabulary (RUC) fired a Browning machine gun from a Shorland armoured car into the flats. The RUC claimed that it was coming under sniper attack from the tower at the time. Patrick Rooney's death took place during a day of street violence in the area. Chairman of the enquiry into the riots, Mr Justice Scarman, found the use of the Browning machine gun "wholly unjustifiable".

On 12 May 1981, an Army sniper killed INLA member Emmanuel McClarnon from the top of Divis Tower, on the night that Francis Hughes died on hunger strike.

INLA 1982 bombing

In September 1982, an INLA unit detonated a bomb hidden in a drainpipe along a balcony, killing British soldier Kevin Waller, who was aged 20, and two boys, Stephen Bennet (14) and Kevin Valliday (12); three other civilians and another British soldier were injured in the blast.

Dismantling of the post
Following the IRA's statement that it was ending its armed campaign, the Army decided to dismantle the observation post, dubbed a 'spy' post by Sinn Féin. Removal of the observation post commenced on 2 August 2005. In 2009, the top two floors of the tower were reinstated as residential properties. As part of a  £1.1 million refurbishment programme by the Northern Ireland Housing Executive, eight extra flats were provided.

In popular culture
Both Divis Tower and the former Divis Flats have featured in multiple works of popular culture.

In films
In the film '71, new recruits to the British Army, who are deployed in Belfast, are told to never enter Divis Flats. However, when a father and daughter find the protagonist lying unconscious in the street, injured by bomb shrapnel, they carry him to their home in Divis Flats and tend to his wounds. Only then do they realise he is a soldier, which presents problems for all three of them.

In photography
Divis Flats and Divis Tower feature in numerous iconic photographs of the Troubles in Northern Ireland.

In television
Divis Tower was featured in the popular BBC Northern Ireland sitcom Give My Head Peace. The fictional characters of Da, Cal, Ma, and for a while Dympna and Emer, all nationalists/republicans, lived in "Flat 47A, Divis Tower". It was first seen in the pilot episode entitled "Two Ceasefires and a Wedding" (made in 1995), followed by the full series commencing in 1998. "Da" was a Sinn Féin assembly man and a staunch republican, who based his family in Divis Tower in  the 1970s. The flat was constantly raided by the RUC (later the Police Service of Northern Ireland (PSNI)). It was in the flat that the Protestant character "Billy", a RUC/PSNI policeman, met Da's daughter Emer and fell in love, later marrying her.

In Literature
Divis Tower is mentioned in Adrian McKinty's novel The Cold Cold Ground.

References

Buildings and structures completed in 1966
Buildings and structures in Belfast
Residential buildings in Northern Ireland
Towers in Northern Ireland
20th-century architecture in Northern Ireland